Macrothyatira subaureata is a moth in the family Drepanidae. It is found in Yunnan, China.

References

Moths described in 1941
Thyatirinae
Moths of Asia